The Round Mountain Oil Field is a large oil and gas field in the foothills of the Sierra Nevada, about  northeast of Bakersfield, California, United States. It is east of the giant Kern River Oil Field, one of the largest in the United States, and also close to the Mount Poso Oil Field and Kern Front Oil Field.

Setting

The oil field is northeast of the city of Bakersfield, between the Kern River and Poso Creek, in the lower foothills of the Sierra Nevada. The main access to the field is from the south, by way of Round Mountain Road, which also passes through the huge and much more densely developed Kern River Oil Field. Topographic relief is high in some parts of the field, especially the northern part of the Main Area, which is intersected by numerous deep canyons.

Being mostly within the ecological subsection of the California Central Valley known as the Hardpan Terraces, the predominant native vegetation is needlegrass, with some scrub occurring, especially on north-facing slopes. The climate is hot and arid, with summertime temperatures routinely exceeding ; the mean freeze-free period runs from about 250 to 300 days. Runoff is quick, and streams are dry in the summer and early autumn; water from the area flows out by Poso Creek and the Kern River to closed basins in the southern San Joaquin Valley, including Buena Vista Lake.

The field itself is spread out into five named areas, several of which consist of multiple discontiguous productive regions. North of the main area is the Coffee Canyon Area, and northeast is the Pyramid Area. To the west of the Main Area are the two separate pools in the Sharktooth Area, and the two pools in the Alma Area.

Geology

Oil in the Round Mountain Field comes from four primary pools, the Freeman-Jewett, Pyramid Hill, Vedder, and Walker. Each resides in a sedimentary formation equivalently named, and are listed from top to bottom in stratigraphic sequence. The Freeman-Jewett and Pyramid Hill are of Miocene Age; the Vedder of Oligocene; and the lowest-lying productive unit, the Walker Formation, was deposited during the Eocene and Oligocene.

The field is bounded on the northeast by a fault which serves as a structural trap since it is upgradient from the oil pools.

Oil from the field is generally heavy, with API gravity ranging from 13 at the Sharktooth and Alma areas to 22 in the Jewett pool in the Main Area.  Waterflooding and cyclic steam processes have been used to retrieve some of the heavier petroleum since the early 1960s.

History, production, and operations
The discovery well was drilled by Getty Oil, now part of Chevron Corp., in May 1927, in the Pyramid Hill pool of the Main Area.  Dates of discovery of other parts of the field were 1928 for the Coffee Canyon Area, 1937 for the Pyramid Area, 1943 for the Sharktooth Area, and most recently 1974 for the Alma Area.  The peak production for the field as a whole was 1938, during which  barrels of oil were pumped out.

As of 2008, Chevron retained no operating units in the field, and the current operators included Macpherson Oil Co., Coffee Petroleum, Pace Diversified Corp., and Arthur McAdams.  None of the major oil companies had operations at Round Mountain.

References
 California Oil and Gas Fields, Volumes I, II and III. Vol. I (1998), Vol. II (1992), Vol. III (1982). California Department of Conservation, Division of Oil, Gas, and Geothermal Resources (DOGGR). 1,472 pp. South Cuyama Oil Field information pp. 120–124. PDF file available on CD from www.consrv.ca.gov.
 California Department of Conservation, Oil and Gas Statistics, Annual Report, December 31, 2006.

Notes

Oil fields in Kern County, California
Oil fields in California